Room for Two is an American sitcom television series starring Patricia Heaton and Linda Lavin that aired for two seasons on ABC from March 24, 1992 to July 6, 1993.

Overview
Patricia Heaton stars as Jill Kurland, an executive producer of a New York City television show called Wake Up, New York. The show focused on Jill's relationship with her mother Edie (Linda Lavin) from Ohio, who joined Jill's show as a result of her humorous and misplaced opinions and criticisms.

Cast
Patricia Heaton as Jill Kurland
Linda Lavin as Edie Kurland
Peter Michael Goetz as Ken Kazurinsky
Paula Kelly as Diahnn Boudreaud
Bess Meyer as Naomi Dylan
Andrew Prine as Reid Ellis
John Putch as Matt Draughon
Jeff Yagher as Keith Wyman

Episode list

Season 1 (1992)

Season 2 (1992–93)

See also

Great News, a later two season sitcom, featuring a very similar premise of a daughter working as a television producer, whose mother ends up working on the same show, and interfering with both her work and love life.

DVD releases
There are currently no DVD releases planned by Warner Bros., who owns the rights. However, the second episode was included in a commemorative DVD released by Warner Bros. during their 50th anniversary, along with the pilot of My Sister Sam.

References

External links

1992 American television series debuts
1993 American television series endings
1990s American sitcoms
American Broadcasting Company original programming
Television series by Warner Bros. Television Studios
English-language television shows
Television shows set in New York City